Wallace State Park is a  public recreation area located  south of Cameron in Clinton County, Missouri. The state park's  encompass a  lake, Lake Allaman, for swimming, fishing, and boating, hiking trails, picnicking facilities, and a campground.

History
The state acquired the park's first 121 acres in 1932 and named it for the family who had owned the land for more than a century, The Works Progress Administration performed much of the site's early development during the 1930s.

References

External links
Wallace State Park Missouri Department of Natural Resources
Wallace State Park Map Missouri Department of Natural Resources

State parks of Missouri
Protected areas of Clinton County, Missouri
Protected areas established in 1932
Works Progress Administration in Missouri
1932 establishments in Missouri